Manuel Vázquez may refer to:

Manuel Vázquez Gallego (1930–1995), Spanish cartoonist
Manuel Vázquez Hueso (born 1981), Spanish cyclist
Manuel Vázquez Montalbán (1939–2003), Spanish writer
Manuel Vera Vázquez (born 1962), Spanish rower